The Philipps University of Marburg was founded in 1527 by Philip I, Landgrave of Hesse, which makes it one of Germany's oldest universities and the oldest still operating Protestant university in the world. It is now a public university of the state of Hesse, without religious affiliation. The University of Marburg has about 23,500 students and 7,500 employees and is located in Marburg, a town of 76,000 inhabitants, with university buildings dotted in or around the town centre. About 14% of the students are international, the highest percentage in Hesse. It offers an International summer university programme and offers student exchanges through the Erasmus programme.

History
In 1609, the University of Marburg established the world's first professorship in chemistry. In 2012 it opened the first German interactive chemistry museum, called . Its experimental course programme is aimed at encouraging young people to pursue careers in science.
The university was among the first in Germany to offer courses in gender studies.

Nazi period

20 professors were expelled in 1933, among them economist  who emigrated and linguist  who committed suicide.

After 1945
Since the 1970s especially the Department of Social Sciences is regarded as a leftist stronghold, with  being a major influence within the field of political science in post-war Germany.

Academics

Research
The university is significant for its life sciences research, but is also home to one of the few centers that conduct research on the Middle East, the CNMS (center for near and middle eastern studies). The departments of psychology and geography reached Excellence Group status in the Europe-wide CHE Excellence Ranking 2009.

Its research is illustrated by its participation in several SFBs. These collaborative research centres are financed by the German Science Foundation . They encourage researchers to cross the boundaries of disciplines, institutes, departments and faculties within the participating university. The current SFB at Philipps-University Marburg are:
    SFB/TR17 – Ras-dependent Pathways in Human Cancer (started 2004; with )
    SFB/TR22 – Allergic response of the lung (started 2005, with Research Center Borstel and LMU Munich)
    SFB/TR81 – Chromatin Changes in Differentiation and Malignancies (started 2010, with )
    SFB-TRR 135 – Cardinal mechanisms of perception (started 2014, with )
    SFB 593 – Mechanisms of cellular compartmentalisation and the relevance for disease (started 2003)
    SFB 987 – Microbial Diversity in Environmental Signal Response (started 2012, with Max Planck Institute for Terrestrial Microbiology, Marburg)
    SFB 1083 – Structure and Dynamics of Internal Interfaces (started 2013, with Donostia International Physics Center San Sebastián, Spain)
    SFB 1021 – RNA viruses: RNA metabolism, host response and pathogenesis (started 2013, with )

Collections of the university
 , the university's old botanical garden
 , the university's current botanical garden
  (Collection of photographs taken from medieval charters)
  (German national picture archive of arts)
  (Collection of religious objects)
  (Linguistic Atlas of Germany)
  (Museum of Mineralogy)
  (Museum of Arts)
 (Museum of Anatomy and Medical History)

Rankings

For 2020–21 the university was ranked as 28th nationally and 369th worldwide.

Gallery

Notable alumni and faculty

Natural scientists

 Ludwig Aschoff
 Emil von Behring
 Karl Ferdinand Braun
 Klaus Bringmann
 Robert Bunsen
 Adolf Butenandt
 Georg Ludwig Carius
 Franz Ludwig Fick
 Hans Fischer
 Edward Frankland
 Frederick Augustus Genth
 Johann Peter Griess
 Karl Eugen Guthe
 Otto Hahn
 Johannes Hartmann
 Thomas Archer Hirst
 Erich Hückel
 Kathrin Jansen
 Hermann Knoblauch
 Hermann Kolbe
 Albrecht Kossel
 Ulrich Lemmer
 Otto Loewi
 Carl Ludwig
 Hans Meerwein
 Ludwig Mond
 Denis Papin
 Heinrich Petraeus (1589–1620)
 Otto Schindewolf
 Thorsten M. Schlaeger
 Sunao Tawara
 John Tyndall
 Wilhelm Walcher
 Alfred Wegener
 Georg Wittig
 Alexandre Yersin
 Karl Ziegler
 Theodor Zincke
 Adolf Fick

Theologians
Marburg was always known as a humanities-focused university. It retained that strength, especially in Philosophy and Theology for a long time after World War II.

 Rudolf Bultmann
 Karl Barth
 
 Friedrich Heiler
 Wilhelm Herrmann
 Aegidius Hunnius
 Andreas Hyperius
 Otto Kaiser
 Helmut Koester
 Jacob Lorhard
 Rudolf Otto
 Johann Jakob Pfeiffer
 Kurt Rudolph
 Annemarie Schimmel
 Paul Tillich
 August Friedrich Christian Vilmar
 Gottlieb Olpp - on medical missionary

Philosophers

 Wolfgang Abendroth
 Hannah Arendt
 Karl Theodor Bayrhoffer
 Ernst Cassirer
 Hermann Cohen
 Hans-Georg Gadamer
 Nicolai Hartmann
 Martin Heidegger
 Hans Heinz Holz
 Hans Jonas
 Friedrich Albert Lange
 Karl Löwith
 Paul Natorp
 José Ortega y Gasset
 Isaac Rülf
 Leo Strauss
 Christian Wolff
 Eduard Zeller

Other

 Hermann Behrends (1907–1948), German Nazi SS officer executed for war crimes
 Gottfried Benn
 Gerold Bepler
 Jessie Forbes Cameron (1883–1968)
 Georg Friedrich Creuzer
 T. S. Eliot (who had to quit a summer school in August 1914, at the start of World War I)
 Johannes Goddaeus
 Jacob Grimm
 Wilhelm Grimm
 Caspar Friedrich Hachenberg
 Gustav Heinemann
 :de:Jost Hermand
 Beatrice Heuser
 Stefan Hofmann
 Kim Hwang-sik
 Wilhelm Liebknecht
 Mikhail Lomonosov
 Carlyle Ferren MacIntyre
 Ulrike Meinhof
 Friedrich Paulus
 Boris Pasternak
 Ernst Reuter
 Ferdinand Sauerbruch
 Friedrich Carl von Savigny
 Heinrich Schütz
 Moritz Schuppert
 Manfred Siebald
 Wilhelm Röpke
 Costas Simitis
 Jack Thiessen
 Dmitry Ivanovich Vinogradov
 Ingeborg Weber-Kellermann
 Richard Wiese (linguist)

See also
 List of early modern universities in Europe
 List of universities in Germany
 University hospital Giessen und Marburg

Notes

External links

 

 
1527 establishments in the Holy Roman Empire
Biosafety level 4 laboratories
Educational institutions established in the 1520s
Universities and colleges in Hesse